Fast Horse is a 2018 documentary film by Alexandra Lazarowich. It won the Special Jury Award at Sundance, and the Best Documentary Work Short Format Award at the 2018 ImagineNATIVE Film and Media Arts Festival.  It also received three Golden Sheaf Awards at the 2019 Yorkton Film Festival.

References

External links
 Fast Horse

Canadian short documentary films
First Nations films
2010s Canadian films
2018 short documentary films